James MacCash (1834–1922) was the founder of the Order of Scottish Clans and founded it while celebrating his birthday in St. Louis in 1878. Born in Springburn, Glasgow, Scotland, he emigrated to the United States of America in 1865. He died at St. Louis, Missouri, and is interred at Bellefontaine Cemetery.

References

External links 

1834 births
1922 deaths
Scottish emigrants to the United States
People from Springburn
People from St. Louis